Robert Hamilton Kennedy (December 30, 1869 – August 24, 1951) was a farmer, merchant and political figure in Nova Scotia, Canada. He represented Colchester County in the Nova Scotia House of Assembly from 1911 to 1920 as a Liberal-Conservative member. His son, Cyril Kennedy became a Canadian Member of Parliament.

He was born in Brookfield, Nova Scotia, the son of James Kennedy and Mary Jane Hamilton. He worked on the family farm and then went to Manitoba in 1890, returning two years later and entering the lumber trade. In 1893, Kennedy worked as a carpenter in Massachusetts. He came back to Nova Scotia again later that year and from then on worked as a farmer and lumber merchant, also operating sawmills. In 1896, Kennedy married Bessie Jane Ross. He served nine years as a member of the Colchester County council. He also was quartermaster in the militia for the Pictou, Colchester and Hants counties and was commissioned during the First World War as a Captain in the 78th Pictou Regiment but did not serve overseas. Kennedy died in a car accident in Truro on August 24, 1951.

Kennedy served in the 35th General Assembly of Nova Scotia and 36th General Assembly of Nova Scotia representing Colchester County alongside Frank Stanfield.

References 
 
 

1869 births
1951 deaths
Progressive Conservative Association of Nova Scotia MLAs